Dumas High School is a public high school located in the city of Dumas, Texas, USA and classified as a 4A school by the UIL.  It is a part of the Dumas Independent School District located in central Moore County.  In 2015, the school was rated "Met Standard" by the Texas Education Agency.

Athletics
The Dumas Demons and Demonettes compete in these sports - 

Volleyball, Cross Country, Football, Basketball, Wrestling, Powerlifting, Soccer, Golf, Tennis, Track, Softball & Baseball

State Titles
Boys Soccer 2020- 
1971(3A) 2022 (4a)
Boys Basketball - 
1962(3A), 1971(3A)
Girls Basketball - 
1980(3A)
Football - 
1961(3A), 1962(3A)
Volleyball - 
1988(4A), 1989(4A), 1990(4A), 1998(4A), 2006(4A)
Wrestling 2016(5A)
 Soccer 2020

References

External links
Dumas ISD website

Public high schools in Texas
Education in Moore County, Texas